Langham Place may be:

 Langham Place (Hong Kong)
 Langham Place, London
 Langham Place, New York, 400 Fifth Avenue
 Langham Place Hotels